Volker Abramczik (born 27 May 1964 in Gelsenkirchen) is a former German football player. The younger brother of German international Rüdiger Abramczik, he played during his career exclusively for sides based in the Ruhr Area.

Starting at the age of four, Volker Abramczik played for the youth sides of FC Schalke 04. In the 1981–82 season, he made his professional debut for Schalke 04, which was at that time was playing in the 2. Bundesliga. The then 17-year-old played a big part in Schalke's promotion to the Bundesliga with 24 caps and six goals. In the following season, Abramczik only played three times and Schalke was relegated to the 2. Bundesliga. One year later, Schalke won the promotion to Bundesliga again, but Abramczik left the club for the 2. Bundesliga side MSV Duisburg. After one year, he transferred to Rot-Weiss Essen where he ended his career in 1990.

References

External links
 

German footballers
German football managers
FC Schalke 04 players
MSV Duisburg players
Rot-Weiss Essen players
Bundesliga players
2. Bundesliga players
Sportspeople from Gelsenkirchen
1964 births
Living people
Biography articles needing translation from German Wikipedia
Sports articles needing translation from German Wikipedia
Association football forwards
Footballers from North Rhine-Westphalia
STV Horst-Emscher managers
West German footballers